The 2013–14 Orlando Magic season was the 25th season of the franchise in the National Basketball Association (NBA). The Magic improved upon their league-worst 20–62 record from the previous season, but not by much, finishing 23–59.

Key dates
 June 27: The 2013 NBA draft took place in Newark, New Jersey.
 July 1: The free agency period begun.

Draft picks

1.

Roster

Pre-season

|- style="background:#fcc;"
| 1
| October 9
| New Orleans
| 
| Vučević & Harris (17)
| Jason Maxiell (10)
| Victor Oladipo (9)
| Veterans Memorial Arena9,274
| 0–1
|- style="background:#fcc;"
| 2
| October 11
| Cleveland
| 
| Victor Oladipo (18)
| Victor Oladipo (8)
| Jameer Nelson (7)
| Amway Center13,611
| 0–2
|- style="background:#cfc;"
| 3
| October 14
| @ Dallas
| 
| Maurice Harkless (16)
| Victor Oladipo (11)
| Victor Oladipo (4)
| American Airlines Center17,136
| 1–2
|- style="background:#fcc;"
| 4
| October 16
| @ Houston
| 
| E'Twaun Moore (17)
| Andrew Nicholson (9)
| Jameer Nelson (6)
| Toyota Center12,341
| 1–3
|- style="background:#fcc;"
| 5
| October 18
| Memphis
| 
| Victor Oladipo (22)
| Nikola Vučević (11)
| Jameer Nelson (6)
| Amway Center13,041
| 1–4
|- style="background:#cfc;"
| 6
| October 20
| Detroit
| 
| E'Twaun Moore (14)
| Kyle O'Quinn (9)
| Victor Oladipo (7)
| Amway Center12,967
| 2–4
|- style="background:#fcc;"
| 7
| October 22
| @ San Antonio
| 
| Victor Oladipo (22)
| Kyle O'Quinn (9)
| Afflalo & Oladipo (6)
| AT&T Center16,326
| 2–5
|- style="background:#fcc;"
| 8
| October 25
| New Orleans
| 
| Tobias Harris (12)
| Vučević, Osby, Jones (7)
| Ronnie Price (5)
| Amway Center13,401
| 2–6

Regular season

Standings

Game log

|- style="background:#fcc;"
| 1
| October 29
| @ Indiana
| 
| Andrew Nicholson (18)
| Nikola Vučević (10)
| Jameer Nelson (7)
| Bankers Life Fieldhouse18,165
| 0–1
|- style="background:#fcc;"
| 2
| October 30
| @ Minnesota
| 
| Arron Afflalo (28)
| Nikola Vučević (16)
| Jameer Nelson (8)
| Target Center17,988
| 0–2

|- style="background:#cfc;"
| 3
| November 1
| New Orleans
| 
| Arron Afflalo (30)
| Maurice Harkless (8)
| Victor Oladipo (6)
| Amway Center18,846
| 1–2
|- style="background:#cfc;"
| 4
| November 3
| Brooklyn
| 
| Vučević & Oladipo (19)
| Nikola Vučević (12)
| Arron Afflalo (8)
| Amway Center15,297
| 2–2
|- style="background:#cfc;"
| 5
| November 6
| L.A. Clippers
| 
| Nikola Vučević (30)
| Nikola Vučević (21)
| Jameer Nelson (8)
| Amway Center15,807
| 3–2
|- style="background:#fcc;"
| 6
| November 8
| Boston
| 
| Arron Afflalo (23)
| Nikola Vučević (13)
| Jameer Nelson (7)
| Amway Center17,555
| 3–3
|- style="background:#fcc;"
| 7
| November 9
| @ Atlanta
| 
| Arron Afflalo (21)
| Vučević & Nicholson (6)
| Arron Afflalo (7)
| Philips Arena15,189
| 3–4
|- style="background:#fcc;"
| 8
| November 11
| @ Boston
| 
| Arron Afflalo (18)
| Nikola Vučević (10)
| Arron Afflalo (7)
| TD Garden18,624
| 3–5
|- style="background:#cfc;"
| 9
| November 13
| Milwaukee
| 
| Arron Afflalo (36)
| Nikola Vučević (11)
| Arron Afflalo (6)
| Amway Center13,588
| 4–5
|- style="background:#fcc;"
| 10
| November 16
| Dallas
| 
| Arron Afflalo (25)
| Nikola Vučević (8)
| Victor Oladipo (6)
| Amway Center15,039
| 4–6
|- style="background:#fcc;"
| 11
| November 20
| Miami
| 
| Arron Afflalo (30)
| Nikola Vučević (6)
| Jameer Nelson (5)
| Amway Center17,526
| 4–7
|- style="background:#fcc;"
| 12
| November 23
| @ Miami
| 
| Glen Davis (20)
| Nikola Vučević (9)
| Jameer Nelson (6)
| American Airlines Arena19,647
| 4–8
|- style="background:#fcc;"
| 13
| November 24
| Phoenix
| 
| Nikola Vučević (20)
| Nikola Vučević (10)
| Jameer Nelson (9)
| Amway Center15,785
| 4–9
|- style="background:#cfc;"
| 14
| November 26
| @ Atlanta
| 
| Arron Afflalo (26)
| Nikola Vučević (15)
| Jameer Nelson (10)
| Philips Arena13,164
| 5–9
|- style="background:#cfc;"
| 15
| November 27
| Philadelphia
| 
| Nikola Vučević (21)
| Nikola Vučević (16)
| Oladipo & Vučević (5)
| Amway Center15,839
| 6–9
|- style="background:#fcc;"
| 16
| November 29
| San Antonio
| 
| Arron Afflalo (17)
| Glen Davis (8)
| Lamb & Moore
| Amway Center15,159
| 6–10

|- style="background:#fcc;"
| 17
| December 2
| @ Washington
| 
| Arron Afflalo (21)
| Nikola Vučević (8)
| Ronnie Price (4)
| Verizon Center12,809
| 6–11
|- style="background:#fcc;"
| 18
| December 3
| @ Philadelphia
| 
| Arron Afflalo (43)
| Victor Oladipo (10)
| Glen Davis (6)
| Wells Fargo Center10,061
| 6–12
|- style="background:#fcc;"
| 19
| December 6
| @ New York
| 
| Arron Afflalo (20)
| Davis & Oladipo (9)
| Jameer Nelson (9)
| Madison Square Garden19,812
| 6–13
|- style="background:#fcc;"
| 20
| December 8
| @ Houston
| 
| Glen Davis (18)
| Arron Afflalo (9)
| Jameer Nelson (4)
| Toyota Center16,407
| 6–14
|- style="background:#fcc;"
| 21
| December 9
| @ Memphis
| 
| Nelson & Nicholson (19)
| Andrew Nicholson (11)
| Jameer Nelson (5)
| FedExForum13,511
| 6–15
|- style="background:#cfc;"
| 22
| December 11
| @ Charlotte
| 
| Davis & Nelson (17)
| Nikola Vučević (14)
| Jameer Nelson (6)
| Time Warner Cable Arena11,377
| 7–15
|- style="background:#fcc;"
| 23
| December 13
| Cleveland
| 
| Victor Oladipo (26)
| Nikola Vučević (13)
| Afflalo & Nelson (5)
| Amway Center16,119
| 7–16
|- style="background:#fcc;"
| 24
| December 15
| @ Oklahoma City
| 
| Arron Afflalo (25)
| Nikola Vučević (16)
| Jameer Nelson (8)
| Chesapeake Energy Arena18,203
| 7–17
|- style="background:#cfc;"
| 25
| December 16
| @ Chicago
| 
| Arron Afflalo (23)
| Davis & Vučević (11)
| Jameer Nelson (7)
| United Center21,200
| 8–17
|- style="background:#fcc;"
| 26
| December 18
| Utah
| 
| Jameer Nelson (17)
| Nikola Vučević (14)
| Jameer Nelson (4)
| Amway Center15,574
| 8–18
|- style="background:#fcc;"
| 27
| December 21
| Sacramento
| 
| Arron Afflalo (26)
| O'Quinn & Vučević (9)
| Davis & Nelson (3)
| Amway Center14,283
| 8–19
|- style="background:#fcc;"
| 28
| December 23
| New York
| 
| Arron Afflalo (26)
| Nikola Vučević (12)
| Jameer Nelson (10)
| Amway Center15,105
| 8–20
|- style="background:#cfc;"
| 29
| December 27
| Detroit
| 
| Arron Afflalo (23)
| Nikola Vučević (11)
| Victor Oladipo (11)
| Amway Center16,464
| 9–20
|- style="background:#cfc;"
| 30
| December 29
| Atlanta
| 
| Arron Afflalo (21)
| Nikola Vučević (14)
| Nelson & Oladipo (8)
| Amway Center15,415
| 10–20
|- style="background:#fcc;"
| 31
| December 31
| Golden State
| 
| Arron Afflalo (15)
| Tobias Harris (9)
| Jameer Nelson (6)
| Amway Center15,062
| 10–21

|- style="background:#fcc;"
| 32
| January 2
| @ Cleveland
| 
| Glen Davis (16)
| Glen Davis (13)
| Jameer Nelson (9)
| Quicken Loans Arena14,248
| 10–22
|- style="background:#fcc;"
| 33
| January 4
| Miami
| 
| Jameer Nelson (21)
| Tobias Harris (10)
| Jameer Nelson (6)
| Amway Center18,846
| 10–23
|- style="background:#fcc;"
| 34
| January 6
| @ L.A. Clippers
| 
| Harkless & Oladipo (22)
| Glen Davis (11)
| Victor Oladipo (5)
| Staples Center19,060
| 10–24
|- style="background:#fcc;"
| 35
| January 8
| @ Portland
| 
| Arron Afflalo (22)
| Tobias Harris (8)
| Jameer Nelson (10)
| Moda Center18,949
| 10–25
|- style="background:#fcc;"
| 36
| January 10
| @ Sacramento
| 
| Tobias Harris (16)
| Glen Davis (12)
| Jameer Nelson (8)
| Sleep Train Arena15,694
| 10–26
|- style="background:#fcc;"
| 37
| January 11
| @ Denver
| 
| Tobias Harris (22)
| Tobias Harris (9)
| Jameer Nelson (7)
| Pepsi Center17,947
| 10–27
|- style="background:#fcc;"
| 38
| January 13
| @ Dallas
| 
| Jameer Nelson (21)
| Glen Davis (8)
| Jameer Nelson (7)
| American Airlines Center19,695
| 10–28
|- style="background:#fcc;"
| 39
| January 15
| Chicago
| 
| Victor Oladipo (35)
| Tobias Harris (16)
| Jameer Nelson (10)
| Amway Center16,489
| 10–29
|- style="background:#fcc;"
| 40
| January 17
| Charlotte
| 
| Arron Afflalo (24)
| Glen Davis (11)
| Victor Oladipo (10)
| Amway Center16,164
| 10–30
|- style="background:#cfc;"
| 41
| January 19
| Boston
| 
| Arron Afflalo (20)
| Arron Afflalo (13)
| Jameer Nelson (10)
| Amway Center17,548
| 11–30
|- style="background:#fcc;"
| 42
| January 21
| @ Brooklyn
| 
| Kyle O'Quinn (15)
| Kyle O'Quinn (8)
| Jameer Nelson (10)
| Barclays Center15,482
| 11–31
|- style="background:#fcc;"
| 43
| January 22
| Atlanta
| 
| Victor Oladipo (24)
| Tobias Harris (12)
| Nelson & Oladipo (7)
| Amway Center16,713
| 11–32
|- style="background:#cfc;"
| 44
| January 24
| L.A. Lakers
| 
| Tobias Harris (28)
| Tobias Harris (20)
| Afflalo & Nelson (6)
| Amway Center16,101
| 12–32
|- style="background:#fcc;"
| 45
| January 26
| @ New Orleans
| 
| Arron Afflalo (25)
| Tobias Harris (9)
| Jameer Nelson (8)
| New Orleans Arena17,197
| 12–33
|- style="background:#fcc;"
| 46
| January 28
| @ Detroit
| 
| Victor Oladipo (19)
| Kyle O'Quinn (11)
| Jameer Nelson (7)
| Palace of Auburn Hills11,534
| 12–34
|- style="background:#fcc;"
| 47
| January 29
| @ Toronto
| 
| Nikola Vučević (16)
| Tobias Harris (11)
| Davis & Nelson (4)
| Air Canada Centre17,694
| 12–35
|- style="background:#cfc;"
| 48
| January 31
| Milwaukee
| 
| Arron Afflalo (21)
| Kyle O'Quinn (7)
| Victor Oladipo (7)
| Amway Center17,292
| 13–35

|- style="background:#fcc;"
| 49
| February 2
| @ Boston
| 
| Arron Afflalo (18)
| Nikola Vučević (11)
| Victor Oladipo (5)
| TD Garden18,624
| 13–36
|- style="background:#fcc;"
| 50
| February 3
| @ Indiana
| 
| Arron Afflalo (20)
| Nikola Vučević (13)
| Victor Oladipo (11)
| Bankers Life Fieldhouse16,266
| 13–37
|- style="background:#cfc;"
| 51
| February 5
| Detroit
| 
| Victor Oladipo (20)
| Maurice Harkless (9)
| Jameer Nelson (11)
| Amway Center15,166
| 14–37
|- style="background:#cfc;"
| 52
| February 7
| Oklahoma City
| 
| Tobias Harris (18)
| Nikola Vučević (10)
| Afflalo & Harris (5)
| Amway Center15,595
| 15–37
|- style="background:#cfc;"
| 53
| February 9
| Indiana
| 
| Victor Oladipo (23)
| Nikola Vučević (13)
| Victor Oladipo (4)
| Amway Center16,366
| 16–37
|- style="background:#fcc;"
| 54
| February 12
| Memphis
| 
| Harris & Vučević (13)
| Nikola Vučević (10)
| Jameer Nelson (7)
| Amway Center15,310
| 16–38
|- align="center"
|colspan="9" bgcolor="#bbcaff"|All-Star Break
|- style="background:#fcc;"
| 55
| February 18
| @ Milwaukee
| 
| Arron Afflalo (21)
| Harris, O'Quinn, & Vučević (9)
| Jameer Nelson (13)
| BMO Harris Bradley Center11,106
| 16–39
|- style="background:#fcc;"
| 56
| February 19
| @ Cleveland
| 
| Arron Afflalo (23)
| Nikola Vučević (12)
| Jameer Nelson (9)
| Quicken Loans Arena16,539
| 16–40
|- style="background:#cfc;"
| 57
| February 21
| New York
| 
| Arron Afflalo (32)
| Nikola Vučević (15)
| Victor Oladipo (14)
| Amway Center16,498
| 17–40
|- style="background:#fcc;"
| 58
| February 23
| @ Toronto
| 
| Tobias Harris (28)
| Tobias Harris (6)
| Jameer Nelson (8)
| Air Canada Centre17,435
| 17–41
|- style="background:#fcc;"
| 59
| February 25
| @ Washington
| 
| Victor Oladipo (26)
| Nikola Vučević (14)
| Jameer Nelson (8)
| Verizon Center13,306
| 17–42
|- style="background:#cfc;"
| 60
| February 26
| @ Philadelphia
| 
| Nikola Vučević (21)
| Nikola Vučević (13)
| Jameer Nelson (12)
| Wells Fargo Center12,817
| 18–42

|- style="background:#fcc;"
| 61
| March 1
| @ Miami
| 
| Tobias Harris (20)
| Kyle O'Quinn (15)
| Jameer Nelson (11)
| American Airlines Arena19,834
| 18–43
|- style="background:#cfc;"
| 62
| March 2
| Philadelphia
| 
| Tobias Harris (31)
| Nikola Vučević (17)
| Victor Oladipo (4)
| Amway Center16,704
| 19–43
|- style="background:#fcc;"
| 63
| March 5
| Houston
| 
| Arron Afflalo (18)
| Nikola Vučević (10)
| Ronnie Price (5)
| Amway Center16,012
| 19–44
|- style="background:#fcc;"
| 64
| March 8
| @ San Antonio
| 
| Tobias Harris (23)
| Nikola Vučević (13)
| Jameer Nelson (5)
| AT&T Center18,581
| 19–45
|- style="background:#fcc;"
| 65
| March 10
| @ Milwaukee
| 
| Maurice Harkless (14)
| Nikola Vučević (12)
| Jameer Nelson (7)
| BMO Harris Bradley Center10,114
| 19–46
|- style="background:#fcc;"
| 66
| March 12
| Denver
| 
| Arron Afflalo (24)
| Nikola Vučević (16)
| Jameer Nelson (9)
| Amway Center16,097
| 19–47
|- style="background:#fcc;"
| 67
| March 14
| Washington
| 
| Tobias Harris (21)
| Nikola Vučević (12)
| Jameer Nelson (8)
| Amway Center16,011
| 19–48
|- style="background:#fcc;"
| 68
| March 18
| @ Golden State
| 
| Nikola Vučević (15)
| Tobias Harris (6)
| Jameer Nelson (7)
| Oracle Arena19,596
| 19–49
|- style="background:#fcc;"
| 69
| March 19
| @ Phoenix
| 
| Arron Afflalo (20)
| Kyle O'Quinn (11)
| Victor Oladipo (9)
| US Airways Center17,508
| 19–50
|- style="background:#fcc;"
| 70
| March 22
| @ Utah
| 
| Victor Oladipo (19)
| Nikola Vučević (13)
| Arron Afflalo (6)
| EnergySolutions Arena19,228
| 19–51
|- style="background:#fcc;"
| 71
| March 23
| @ L.A. Lakers
| 
| Victor Oladipo (21)
| Nikola Vučević (11)
| Victor Oladipo (10)
| Staples Center17,803
| 19–52
|- style="background:#cfc;"
| 72
| March 25
| Portland
| 
| Tobias Harris (25)
| Tobias Harris (11)
| Victor Oladipo (6)
| Amway Center17,896
| 20–52
|- style="background:#cfc;"
| 73
| March 28
| Charlotte
| 
| Nikola Vučević (24)
| Nikola Vučević (23)
| Jameer Nelson (8)
| Amway Center16,003
| 21–52
|- style="background:#fcc;"
| 74
| March 30
| Toronto
| 
| Nikola Vučević (22)
| Nikola Vučević (10)
| Jameer Nelson (5)
| Amway Center16,018
| 21–53

|- style="background:#fcc;"
| 75
| April 2
| Cleveland
| 
| Victor Oladipo (16)
| Vučević & Harris (7)
| Arron Afflalo (5)
| Amway Center16,092
| 21–54
|- style="background:#fcc;"
| 76
| April 4
| @ Charlotte
| 
| Victor Oladipo (16)
| Dedmon & Harris (17)
| Jameer Nelson (5)
| Time Warner Cable Arena17,708
| 21–55
|- style="background:#cfc;"
| 77
| April 5
| Minnesota
| 
| Arron Afflalo (18)
| Kyle O'Quinn (13)
| Jameer Nelson (12)
| Amway Center16,992
| 22–55
|- style="background:#cfc;"
| 78
| April 9
| Brooklyn
| 
| Arron Afflalo (25)
| Dewayne Dedmon (9)
| Jameer Nelson (7)
| Amway Center16,085
| 23–55
|- style="background:#fcc;"
| 79
| April 11
| Washington
| 
| Arron Afflalo (19)
| Dewayne Dedmon (10)
| Jameer Nelson (11)
| Amway Center17,009
| 23–56
|- style="background:#fcc;"
| 80
| April 13
| @ Brooklyn
| 
| Tobias Harris (18)
| Nicholson & Harris (7)
| Ronnie Price (6)
| Barclays Center17,732
| 23–57
|- style="background:#fcc;"
| 81
| April 14
| @ Chicago
| 
| Kyle O'Quinn (20)
| Dewayne Dedmon (9)
| Ronnie Price (11)
| United Center22,087
| 23–58
|- style="background:#fcc;"
| 82
| April 16
| Indiana
| 
| Maurice Harkless (14)
| Dewayne Dedmon (13)
| Ronnie Price (4)
| Amway Center18,846
| 23–59

Transactions

Free Agency

Awards and honors
 Victor Oladipo – All-Rookie 1st Team

References

Orlando Magic seasons
Orlando Magic
Orlando Magic
Orlando Magic